Savignac-de-l'Isle (literally Savignac on the Isle) is a commune in the Gironde department in Nouvelle-Aquitaine in southwestern France.

Population

See also
Communes of the Gironde department

References

External links

 Official Web site

Communes of Gironde